Omega oxidation (ω-oxidation) is a process of fatty acid metabolism in some species of animals. It is an alternative pathway to beta oxidation that, instead of involving the β carbon, involves the oxidation of the ω carbon (the carbon most distant from the carboxyl group of the fatty acid). The process is normally a minor catabolic pathway for medium-chain fatty acids (10-12 carbon atoms), but becomes more important when β oxidation is defective.

In vertebrates, the enzymes for ω oxidation are located in the smooth ER of liver and kidney cells, instead of in the mitochondria as with β oxidation. The steps of the process are as follows:

After these three steps, either end of the fatty acid can be attached to coenzyme A. The molecule can then enter the mitochondrion and undergo β oxidation. The final products after successive oxidations include succinic acid, which can enter the citric acid cycle, and adipic acid.

The first step in ω-oxidation, i.e. addition of a hydroxy residue to the omega carbon of short, intermediate, and long chain unsaturated or saturated fatty acids, can serve to produce or inactivate signaling molecules.  In humans, a subset of Cytochrome P450 (CYP450) microsome-bound ω-hydroxylases (termed Cytochrome P450 omega hydroxylases) metabolize arachidonic acid (also known as eicosatetraenoic acid) to 20-hydroxyeicosatetraenoic acid (20-HETE). 20-HETE possesses a range of activities in animal and cellular model systems, e.g. it constricts blood vessels, alters the kidney's reabsorption of salt and water, and promotes the growth of cancer cells; genetic studies in humans suggest that 20-HETE contributes to hypertension, myocardial infarction, and brain stroke (see 20-Hydroxyeicosatetraenoic acid). Among the CYP450 superfamily, members of the CYP4A and CYP4F subfamilies viz., CYP4A11, CYP4F2, CYP4F3, are considered the predominant cytochrome P450 enzymes responsible in most tissues for forming 20-HETE.  CYP2U1 and CYP4Z1 contribute to 20-HETE production in a more limited range of tissues.  The cytochrome ω-oxidases including those belonging to the CYP4A and CYP4F sub-families and CYPU21 also ω-hydroxylate and thereby reduce the activity of various fatty acid metabolites of arachidonic acid including LTB4, 5-HETE, 5-oxo-eicosatetraenoic acid, 12-HETE, and several prostaglandins that are involved in regulating various inflammatory, vascular, and other responses in animals and humans. This hydroxylation-induced inactivation may underlie the proposed roles of the cytochromes in dampening inflammatory responses and the reported associations of certain CYP4F2 and CYP4F3 single nucleotide variants with human Crohn's disease and Celiac disease, respectively.

See also
 Beta oxidation
 Alpha oxidation

References

Nelson, D. L. & Cox, M. M. (2005). Lehninger Principles of Biochemistry, 4th Edition. New York: W. H. Freeman and Company, pp. 648–649. .

External links
 http://www.biocarta.com/pathfiles/omegaoxidationPathway.asp

Organic redox reactions